Gazeta Telegraf is an Albanian language daily newspaper published in Tirana, Albania.

History and profile
Gazeta Telegraf was established in 2005. The paper is based in Tirana.

References

External links
 

2005 establishments in Albania
Albanian-language newspapers
Albanian news websites
Mass media in Tirana
Newspapers published in Albania
Newspapers established in 2005